Ērģeme Parish is an administrative unit of Valka Municipality, Latvia.

Towns, villages and settlements of Ērģeme parish

References 

Parishes of Latvia
Valka Municipality